Bothriurus olaen is a species of scorpion from the family Bothriuridae. It lives in mountains Sierras de Córdoba and San Luis Province in central Argentina. Little is known about their habitat, most likely they are mountain dwellers, and nothing is known about their venom.

References

Bothriuridae
Fauna of Argentina
Scorpions of South America
Animals described in 1997